Julbåten Juliana ("Juliana, the Christmas Boat") was the Sveriges Television's Christmas calendar and Sveriges Radio's Christmas Calendar in 1961. The radio version was called Julbåtens resa runt jorden ("The Christmas Boat's Journey Around the Earth").

Plot 
The story follows the crewmembers of the vessel Juliana, bringing products from foreign ports into Sweden in time for Christmas. The idea was to show how Swedish Christmas celebrations rely on international trade.

References

External links 
 

1961 radio programme debuts
1961 radio programme endings
1961 Swedish television series debuts
1961 Swedish television series endings
Fictional ships
Sveriges Radio's Christmas Calendar
Sveriges Television's Christmas calendar